West Kootenai is a census-designated place (CDP) in Lincoln County, Montana, United States. The population was 365 at the 2010 census.

Boarding School
The West Kootenai was the location for an all-boys boarding school due to its remote location. It is now closed.

Geography
West Kootenai is in northern Lincoln County, Montana on the west side of Lake Koocanusa, a large reservoir on the Kootenai River. The community is within the Kootenai National Forest. The northern boundary of the CDP is the Canada–United States border, with the Regional District of East Kootenay, British Columbia, to the north. There is no border crossing through West Kootenai; road access is from the south via West Kootenai Road. The city of Eureka, Montana,  to the southeast as the crow flies, is  distant by road.

Demographics

Lakes
There are a few named lakes in the West Kootenai. Along West Kootenai Road is Tooley Lake and further down is Alkali Lake accessed via dirt road.

See also
Caribou Fire

References

Census-designated places in Lincoln County, Montana
Census-designated places in Montana